Mike Sacks is an American author, humor writer, and magazine editor based in New York City. Sacks is currently an editor at Vanity Fair and formerly worked for The Washington Post.
 He contributes to the New Yorker, McSweeney’s, Esquire, Salon, Vanity Fair, GQ, Believer, Vice, the New York Times, and the Washington Post. As of 2022, Sacks has published a total of ten books, six of which have been under his own imprint.

Sacks' collection of humorous photos of television shows has been featured on NPR and Gawker. He has also been featured in The New York Post, Vanity Fair, and LA Weekly, and has appeared on BBC, CNN and NPR's Weekend Edition.

In 2017, Sacks created a vanity press imprint dubbed "Sunshine Beam Publishing" which he created "primarily to publish stuff no one else would publish."

Episodes of the podcast, Doin' It with Mike Sacks... and Rob!, have been produced since January 2016.

Early life
Sacks was born in Virginia and raised in Maryland. He attended Winston Churchill High School before attending Tulane University in New Orleans.

Books

Other Work 
Some of Sacks' works were originally, or have been adapted into, audiobooks. The audiobook version of Stinker Lets Loose featured Jon Hamm, Andy Richter and Phillip Baker Hall. Passable in Pink was an audiobook satire of John Hughes' filmography, and featured Gillian Jacobs, Adam Scott and Bobby Moynihan.

At The New Yorker in 2021, Sacks interviewed Simpsons writer John Swartzwelder. This was Swartzwelder's first major interview.

Critical Reception 
Sacks is popular with some comedians, including David Sedaris and Andy Richter. Critics tend to appreciate his work, while the general public can be left confused.

This is evident in the reception of Sacks' two interview anthologies, Poking a Dead Frog and Here's the Kicker. While some critics saw and appreciated the interviews as a reflection on working in the industry, many readers expected a manual on how to make it as a comedian.Dead Frog was also criticized for a lack of diversity: 7 of 44 interviews were with women. Others didn't find the writing in either of the anthologies as funny as they expected it to be.

His early work and works published under his own imprint have received both praise and critique.

References

Tulane University alumni
American magazine editors
Living people
Year of birth missing (living people)
American male non-fiction writers